Eiríkur Örn Norðdahl (born 1 July 1978) is an Icelandic writer. For a long time most noted as an experimental poet, he has recently also come to prominence as one of Iceland's foremost prose writers.

Biography
Born in Reykjavík, Eiríkur Örn grew up in Ísafjörður. By Eiríkur's account he committed to a career as a writer around 2000, though he has necessarily often found an income through a wide range of other jobs, experiencing some periods of considerable hardship. He lived in Berlin from around 2002-4, and over the next ten years in various northern European countries, most prominently in  Helsinki (c. 2006-9) and Oulu (c. 2009-11). In 2004 Eiríkur was a founder member of the Icelandic avant-garde poetry collective Nýhil, which organised poetry events and publishing; the co-operative continued until around 2010. He was a prominent contributor to The Reykjavík Grapevine in 2009-11.

Eiríkur Örn has married; his first child was born in 2009.

Awards
In 2008, Eiríkur Örn received the Icelandic Translators Award for his translation of Jonathan Lethem's tourettic novel, Motherless Brooklyn. His poetry-animation Höpöhöpö Böks received an Honorable Mention in 2010 at the Zebra Poetry Film Festival Berlin.

Eiríkur Örn won the 2012 Icelandic Literary Prize in the category of fiction and poetry and the 2012 Book Merchants' Prize for his novel Illska (lit. Evil).

Writing

Poetry
Eiríkur Örn is best known internationally for his poetry, much of which is sound-poetry or multi-media, and which he performs widely. Much of it has been translated, into a variety of languages. His published collections are:

 Óratorrek: Ljóð um samfélagsleg málefni (Reykjavík: Mál og menning, 2017)
 Plokkfiskbókin (Reykjavík : Mál og menning, 2016)
 Hnefi eða vitstola orð, Mál & menning, 2013
 IWF! IWF! OMG! OMG!, a collection of poems translated into German by Jón Bjarni Atlason and Alexander Sitzmann
 Ú á fasismann - og fleiri ljóð, Mál & menning, 2008
 Þjónn, það er Fönix í öskubakkanum mínum, Nýhil, 2007
 Handsprengja í morgunsárið, with Ingólfi Gíslasyni,  Nýhil, 2007
 Blandarabrandarar, Nýhil, 2005
 Nihil Obstat, Nýhil, 2003
 Heimsendapestir, Nýhil, 2002
 Heilagt stríð: runnið undan rifjum drykkjumanna, self-published, 2001

Novels
Eiríkur Örn is best known in Iceland for his novels, of which he has so far published six:

 Hans Blær, Mál og Menning, 2018
 Heimska, Mál og Menning, 2015
 Illska, Mál og Menning, 2012
 Gæska: Skáldsaga, Mál og Menning, 2009
 Eitur fyrir byrjendur, Nýhil, 2006 (in Swedish as Gift för nybörjare, trans. by Anna Gunnarsdotter Grönberg (Rasmus) and in German as Gift für Anfanger)
 Hugsjónadruslan, Mál og Menning, 2004

Translations
 Hvítsvíta by Athena Farrokhzad, Reykjavík : Mál og menning, 2016
 Erfðaskrá vélstúlkunnar by Ida Linde, Meðgönguljóð, 2014
 Friðlaus by Lee Child, 2010
 Spádómar Nostradamusar by Mario Reading, 2010
 Enron by Lucy Prebble, 2010
 Í frjálsu falli by Lee Child, 2009
 Maíkonungurinn - valin ljóð eftir Allen Ginsberg, Mál & menning, 2008
 Doktor Proktor og prumpuduftið by Jo Nesbø, Forlagið, 2008
 Súkkulaði by Joanne Harris, Uppheimar 2007
 131.839 slög með bilum -ljóðaþýðingar, Ntamo, 2007
 Móðurlaus Brooklyn by Jonathan Lethem, Bjartur, 2007
 Heljarþröm by Anthony Horowitz, Forlagið, 2007
 Eminem - ævisaga by Anthony Bozza, Tindur, 2006
 Heimskir hvítir karlar by Michael Moore, Edda-Forlagið, 2003

Essays
 Booby, be Quiet!, Helsinki: Poesia, 2011
 Ást er þjófnaður, Perspired by Iceland/SLIS (Sumarbúðir LIsthneigðra Sósíalista), 2011

Editing
 Eiríkur Örn is an editor of the webzine Starafugl
 Af steypu, with Kári Páll Óskarsson, Nýhil, 2009
 Af ljóðum, Nýhil, 2005

References

Eirikur Orn Norddahl
Eirikur Orn Norddahl
Living people
Eirikur Orn Norddahl
1978 births
Eirikur Orn Norddahl